Wilmington Township is the name of two places in the U.S. state of Pennsylvania:

 Wilmington Township, Lawrence County, Pennsylvania
 Wilmington Township, Mercer County, Pennsylvania

Pennsylvania township disambiguation pages